Rajac is a mountain in western Serbia.

The mountain is touristically the best developed and most accessible in the vicinity of Belgrade. On Rajac the battle of Kolubara was fought during World War I. Trenches dug by the Serbian army in November 1914 are still visible.

Nature
The slopes of the mountain are covered by meadows, clearings and forest of beech, birch, ash, turkey oak, conifer, fir and pine. The meadows grow a large number of medicinal plants. The forests host pheasant, roe deer, fox, wild boar, hare and tortoise.

Scythe festival
Every year in July there is a 3 day long traditional scythe festival. Main happening is competition in traditional grass cutting with scythe - scything. In a big field competitors are gathered in traditional folklore clothes where they perform their scything skills and when finished they are rated by jury. It is not only important to be the fastest one but the quality and technique is important to win as well.
There is many concerts during this three days and also there is a lot of traditional folklore music in big tents (Šatra) with tables and food, mainly pork or lamb roast, but also sour cabbage is something not to miss. Live music is performed by many artist during this days.

Rock climbing at Rajac 
Rajac is the first and only granite climbing crag in Serbia. Located in the village of Građenik, this old granite quarry was turned into a small climbing crag with 36 bolted routes in total, difficulties from 4b to 8a+.

References
http://kosidba.com/manifestacije/o-rajcu/

Geography of Šumadija and Western Serbia
Mountains of Serbia